Serbian singers may refer to:

 Singers from Serbia, singers who are from Serbia
 Serbs singers, singers who are ethnic Serbs

See also 
 Serbian (disambiguation)
 Singer (disambiguation)